Placidiopsis is a genus of lichens in the family Verrucariaceae. The genus was circumscribed by Italian naturalist Francesco Beltramini de Casati in 1858, with Placidiopsis grappae assigned as the type species.

Species
Placidiopsis cinerascens 
Placidiopsis cavicola 
Placidiopsis cinereoides 
Placidiopsis crassa 
Placidiopsis custnani 
Placidiopsis grappae 
Placidiopsis hamadicola 
Placidiopsis hypothallina  – Brazil
Placidiopsis minor 
Placidiopsis novozelandica 
Placidiopsis oreades 
Placidiopsis parva  – Australia
Placidiopsis poronioides  – Hong Kong
Placidiopsis pseudocinerea  – Europe
Placidiopsis sbarbaronis 
Placidiopsis tiroliensis 
Placidiopsis tominii

References

Verrucariales
Lichen genera
Eurotiomycetes genera
Taxa described in 1858